Captain Underpants and the Revolting Revenge of the Radioactive Robo-Boxers is the tenth book in the Captain Underpants series created by Dav Pilkey. It was published on January 15, 2013.

Plot
Continuing from the previous book, it is revealed that the giant zombie nerds move really slowly, so the giant Zombie Nerd Harold actually crushed a giant ketchup packet, not Tippy. Tippy Tinkletrousers travels back to 10 minutes before Kipper and friends see him and freezes them. Tippy shrinks and takes his past self when George and Harold are about to be arrested. He freezes the cops, forming the end of the eighth book. Then he chases George and Harold throughout the city. The boys travel back with their pets, but accidentally take Mr. Krupp with them. Big Tippy sends his smaller self back ten minutes to find where, then back there then, where the small ones zap themselves back and steal the Goosy-Grow 4000,  which turns Tiny Tippy extremely massive. When Big Tippy attempts to use his nuclear bomb to kill Captain Underpants, Supa Mega Tippy zaps himself back in time (with his twin) and kicks Big Tippy and his bomb away into the Gulf of Mexico. When the bomb explodes, it blows a huge crater and kills the dinosaurs.

The five protagonists and their captor then travel to the African savannas where the boys and their pets gain the trust of some cavemen who inhabit the surrounding jungles. The cavemen are taught English through drawings and subsequently, the boys make the world's first comic book (which involves drawings of traps working on Tippy). The Neanderthals, inspired by the book, then set traps for Tippy and defeat him. He then sets off his freeze ray (which has been tampered with by his younger twin so that it could not be turned off), and the Goosy-Grow 4000 enlarges the ice which appears to make Crackers' condition deteriorate and causes the Ice Age (and freezing Tippy himself).

George and Harold are then transported to the future by Slightly Younger Tiny Tippy, who is now gigantic, thanks to the Goosy-Grow 4000. But it turns out they are now teachers at Jerome Horwitz Elementary, and Mr. Krupp is an old man. After getting rid of their evil future selves by vowing never to take life seriously, they snap their fingers, turning both Mr. Krupps into Captain Underpants, and they beat up Slightly Younger Tiny Tippy, who afterward attempts to use his nuclear bomb to blow up the entire galaxy. After that, Crackers and Sulu decide to save the entire galaxy by sending Slightly Younger Tiny Tippy and themselves back to the time before the universe existed (13.7 billion years ago). The three are then killed by Slightly Younger Tiny Tippy's giant nuclear bomb and the universe is formed. It also turns out that Crackers had laid a brood of eggs (revealing Crackers to have been a female) and George, Harold, and the younger Captain Underpants all decide to take care of them. Suddenly, George's and Harold's nemesis, Melvin Sneedly, in a giant Robo-Squid, appears and captures George, Harold, Captain Underpants, and Crackers' eggs, taking them back to the past.

Characters

 George Beard – a 9 3/4-year-old boy with a flat top.
 Harold Hutchins – a 10-year-old boy with a bad haircut.
 Mr. Krupp – George and Harold's mean principal who turns into Captain Underpants at the snap of a finger.
 Captain Underpants – Mr. Krupp's alter-ego.
 Sulu – The bionic hamster of George and Harold.
 Crackers – The pterodactyl of George and Harold. In this book, during Tippy's Ice Age, Crackers begins to feel "ill". When Tippy travels 30 years from the present, Sulu builds a nest for Crackers. When Crackers is getting better already, "he" helps Sulu rid of the last Tippy by traveling with him 13.7 billion years ago. Later, Harold points out that Crackers isn't ill at all - she became pregnant with three eggs.
 Tippy Tinkletrousers – The evil villain in the 4th book and 9th book, who is formerly known as Professor Poopypants. Throughout the book, clones of Tippy Tinkletrousers were created by time. The last one died in a "KA-BLOOSH" when Crackers and Sulu traveled with him to the time before the Universe began.
 Various Cavepeople – When George and Harold travel to the Pleistocene Epoch, they aid a bunch of cavepeople for their help. George and Harold show the cavepeople a wordless cave-comic starring the book's main antagonist Tippy. Inspired, the cavepeople draw out plans on how to end Tippy, from making him slip on banana peels to setting his Robo-Trouser's butt on fire. Tippy then attempts to freeze everyone, but the Freeze Ray won't stop blasting ice, Meanwhile, when Tiny Tippy attempts to grow himself, he accidentally drops the Goosy-Grow 4000 into the ice, causing what we think is an Ice Age. At the snap of a finger, Captain Underpants rips off Tippy's trousers and tells everyone to climb aboard. He carries George, Harold, and all the cavepeople to another country - Chauvet Cave in France.
 Ook and Gluk - George and Harold's cartoon caveboys.
 Lily - Ook and Gluk's pet dinosaur.
 Melvin Sneedly – George and Harold's nemesis from the end of the book.
 Old Mr. Krupp/Old Captain Underpants – Mr. Krupp's 30-year older counterpart.
 Future George and Harold - George and Harold's 30-year older counterparts, who are obnoxious teachers.
 Kipper Krupp - Mr. Krupp's nephew, who appeared in the previous book, where Tippy accidentally scared him and his friends, which resulted in a bad future. In this book, Tippy fixes his mistake by freezing the bullies so that another Tippy wouldn't scare them.
 Bugg, Finkstein, and Loogie - Kipper's friends, who also appeared in the previous book.

References

Captain Underpants novels
2013 American novels
Prehistoric life in popular culture
Novels about time travel
Scholastic Corporation books